Cryptomelaena dynastes is a species of moth of the family Tortricidae. It is found on Sumatra in western Indonesia.

References

Archipini
Moths described in 1983
Moths of Sumatra
Taxa named by Alexey Diakonoff